Cape Peiho is located on the south coast of New Britain in the West New Britain Province  west of Arawe.

West New Britain Province